Borisov is a rural locality (a khutor) in Manoylinskoye Rural Settlement, Kletsky District, Volgograd Oblast, Russia. The population was 93 as of 2010.

Geography 
Borisov is located 90 km south of Kletskaya (the district's administrative centre) by road. Dobrinka is the nearest rural locality.

References 

Rural localities in Kletsky District